

This is a list of the National Register of Historic Places listings in Brown County, Kansas.

This is intended to be a complete list of the properties and districts on the National Register of Historic Places in Brown County, Kansas, United States. The locations of all nationally registered properties and districts of which the latitude and longitude coordinates are included below, may be seen in a map.

There are 14 properties and districts listed on the National Register in the county.

Current listings

|}

See also

 List of National Historic Landmarks in Kansas
 National Register of Historic Places listings in Kansas

References

Brown
National Register of Historic Places in Brown County, Kansas